"That Ain't Right" was the 1942 debut single by The King Cole Trio. "That Ain't Right" hit number one on Billboard magazine's Harlem Hit Parade chart for one week. Although the song was the King Cole Trio's first successful single, it would be their only release for Decca, as the contract with the company expired before "That Ain't Right" became a hit.

Cover versions
Frankie Laine recorded a version of the song and included it on his album Rockin' in 1957.

In popular culture
The song is featured in the musical film Stormy Weather (1943), sung by Ada Brown and Fats Waller.

References

1942 songs
1942 singles
1942 debut singles
Mildred Bailey songs
Songs written by Nat King Cole
Nat King Cole songs